Alma Socorro Martínez Torres (born 22 September 1981) is a former footballer who played as a forward. Born in the United States, Martínez represented the Mexico women's national team, earning nine caps for the team in 2004 and scoring one goal. She competed for Mexico at the 2004 Summer Olympics in Athens, Greece, where the team finished in eighth place.

After graduating from Santa Barbara High School in 1999, Martínez played for the Santa Barbara City Vaqueros in 2000 and 2001. She then joined UC Santa Barbara Gauchos for the 2002 and 2003 seasons, scoring 8 goals and recording 6 assists in 41 appearances for the team.

After her playing career, Martínez served as an assistant coach for the Chico State Wildcats in 2005 and 2006.

References

External links
 
 

1981 births
Living people
American sportspeople of Mexican descent
Citizens of Mexico through descent
Mexican women's footballers
Mexico women's international footballers
Footballers at the 2004 Summer Olympics
Olympic footballers of Mexico
People from Santa Barbara, California
Sportspeople from Santa Barbara, California
Soccer players from California
American women's soccer players
Santa Barbara City College alumni
UC Santa Barbara Gauchos women's soccer players
Women's association football forwards